CDR1 can refer to

 Complementarity-determining region 1 on antibodies
 CDR1 (gene), cerebellar degeneration-related protein 1